William Lawson may refer to:
 William Lawson (banker) (1772–1848), businessman, office holder, justice of the peace and politician born in Nova Scotia
 William Lawson (co-operator) (1836–1916), co-operator and agriculturalist
 William Lawson (explorer) (1774–1850), explorer of New South Wales, Australia
 William Lawson (priest) (c.1554–1635), English cleric and writer on gardening
 William Lawson (speedway rider) (born 1987), former Scottish speedway rider
 B.J. Lawson (William Lawson, born 1974), 2008 Republican Party nominee in North Carolina
 W. R. Lawson William Ramage Lawson (1840–1922), British journalist, economics writer
 William Lawson's, a brand of whisky owned by Bacardi
 Dr. William B. Lawson, African American psychiatrist and researcher